Allison Jaime "A. J." Mleczko Griswold (born June 14, 1975) is an American ice hockey player and analyst. She won a gold medal at the 1998 Winter Olympics and a silver medal at the 2002 Winter Olympics.

Playing career
Mleczko attended New Canaan Country School and is a graduate of The Taft School in Watertown, Connecticut. Mleczko played college hockey at Harvard University, where she led the Crimson to a national title in 1999. That same year she became the second winner of the Patty Kazmaier Award, which is awarded annually to the best female college ice hockey player in the United States. On September 24, 2002, she was inducted into the New England Women's Hall of Fame. She is a hockey commentator for the NHL on ESPN and MSG Networks. She previously worked for the NHL on NBC, where she became the first woman to commentate for an NHL playoff game. Additionally, she hosts the On the Bus With Cammi & AJ podcast with former teammate Cammi Granato.

Mleczko was inducted on June 20, 2019 into the National Polish-American Sports Hall of Fame located in Troy, Michigan. Her paternal great-grandparents were Polish immigrants.

Personal life 
Mleczko currently resides in Concord, Massachusetts with her husband, Jason, and their four children. She is a cousin of diplomat Rufus Gifford.

Awards and honors
1999 American Women's College Hockey Alliance All-Americans, First Team
Patty Kazmaier Award
 1999 USA Hockey Women's Player of the Year Award (also known as the Bob Allen Women's Player of the Year award) 
Women's Beanpot Hall of Fame (inducted 2011)

References

External links
 
 
 
  1998 U.S. Olympic Women’s Ice Hockey Team
 

1975 births
American women's ice hockey forwards
Harvard Crimson women's ice hockey players
Ice hockey people from Massachusetts
Ice hockey players at the 1998 Winter Olympics
Ice hockey players at the 2002 Winter Olympics
Living people
Medalists at the 1998 Winter Olympics
Medalists at the 2002 Winter Olympics
Olympic gold medalists for the United States in ice hockey
Olympic silver medalists for the United States in ice hockey
Patty Kazmaier Award winners
People from Nantucket, Massachusetts
Taft School alumni
Women sports announcers
Ice hockey players from Massachusetts
21st-century American women